The FrancoForum is a specialized language teaching facility owned and operated by the local government in Saint-Pierre and Miquelon, a French collectivity located off the coast of Newfoundland, Canada. Staffed by professional French instructors, the institute offers a variety of courses for both students and teachers wishing to improve their fluency.

The FrancoForum is best known for hosting Le Programme Frecker, a 3-month French immersion program offered to students at Memorial University of Newfoundland. The program, which began in 1973, was originally housed in a small building at the centre of town. In 1992, an agreement was reached with the Conseil Général in Saint-Pierre to relocate the program to the newly built FrancoForum.

Because of its proximity to English-speaking Canada, Saint-Pierre has become a popular destination for anglophone students wishing to become immersed in French language and culture. The Newfoundland and Labrador branch of the Canadian Parents for French organization holds a yearly summer camp program at the FrancoForum. The Francoforum is accredited by the Public Service of Canada for French language training of civil servants.

External links

Schools of French as a second or foreign language
Education in Saint Pierre and Miquelon
Memorial University of Newfoundland
Schools in France
Canada–France relations
Saint-Pierre, Saint Pierre and Miquelon
Language immersion
Adult education